Sione Faumuina (born 27 March 1981) is a New Zealand professional rugby league footballer who plays for the Redcliffe Dolphins in the Queensland Cup.

He joined the Castleford Tigers (Heritage № 893) in the Super League at the start of the 2009 season.

He also has previously played for the Canberra Raiders and the New Zealand Warriors and was due to play for Super League club the Harlequins RL until the club tore up his contract pre-season.

He was released by the New Zealand Warriors in August 2006 for repeated involvement in "cases of serious misconduct", related to alcohol.

Sione Faumuina signed a contract to play for the Harlequins RL, starting from the 2007 season, a contract that Harlequins RL agreed to tear up.

He signed with the North Queensland Cowboys and played with them in 2007 and 2008.

Sione was released by mutual consent from Castleford Tigers at the back end of the 2009 season.

In 2011, Faumuina moved to Tannum Sands to work in local industry. He now plays  for Tannum Sands Gullaz.

Personal life
Faumuina is the former partner of professional netball player Temepara George.
On 4 July 2008, Faumuina is involved in a single vehicle accident near the Lavarack Barracks in Townsville where he rolls his car and escapes unscathed. He left the scene and reported to police 10.5 hours later.
 In August 2009, Faumuina was suspended from the Castleford Tigers and returned to Australia.

References

1981 births
Living people
Canberra Raiders players
Castleford Tigers players
Glenora Bears players
Hull F.C. players
New Zealand national rugby league team players
New Zealand sportspeople of Samoan descent
New Zealand rugby league players
New Zealand Warriors players
North Queensland Cowboys players
Rugby league centres
Rugby league five-eighths
Rugby league locks
Rugby league players from Auckland
Rugby league second-rows
Samoan rugby league players
Waitakere rugby league team players